Genoplesium parvicallum, commonly known as the mountain-top midge-orchid, is a species of orchid which is endemic to Queensland. It is a small orchid with up to twenty five greenish flowers with purplish brown marking and is only known from mountaintops in the McPherson Range. It is treated as Corunastylis parvicalla in Queensland.

Description
The labellum quivers in the slightest breeze and there is a small, club-shaped callus in its centre. Flowering occurs between December and February.

Taxonomy and naming
The mountain-top midge orchid was first formally described in 1945 by Herman Rupp who gave it the name Prasophyllum parvicallum from a specimen collected on Mount Greville and the description was published in The Queensland Naturalist. In 2002, David Jones and Mark Clements changed its name to Corunastylis parvicalla and the species is known by that name in Queensland, but the change is not accepted by the Australian Plant Census. The specific epithet (parvicallum) is derived from the Latin word parvus meaning "little" referring to the small labellum callus of this orchid.

Distribution and habitat
The mountain-top midge-orchid is only known from the summits of a few mountains in the McPherson Range where it grows in shallow soil over rock ledges with grasses and shrubs.

References

parvicallum
Orchids of Queensland
Endemic orchids of Australia
Plants described in 1945